Upper North Sydney is a community in the Canadian province of Nova Scotia, located in the Cape Breton Regional Municipality on Cape Breton Island.

Demographics 

References

 Upper North Sydney on Destination Nova Scotia

Communities in the Cape Breton Regional Municipality
Designated places in Nova Scotia
General Service Areas in Nova Scotia